Madison Avenue is a street in the borough of Manhattan in New York City

Madison Avenue can also refer to:

Madison Avenue (Baltimore), a street in Baltimore, Maryland
Madison Avenue (film), a film by H. Bruce Humberstone with Dana Andrews, Eleanor Parker and Jeanne Crain
Madison Avenue (band), a dance music group from Australia

See also
Madison Avenue Line (disambiguation)
Madison Avenue Grounds, a former baseball field in Baltimore